Lucifera is a genus of bacteria in the Sporomusaceae family. Sanchez-Andrea et al. in 2018 described a novel species of a novel genus for which they proposed the name Lucifera butyrica.

Etymology
The name Lucifera, Latin for "Light-bringing", refers to the bacterium's shape which is like a match, and the old term "Lucifer" for a match.

References

Taxa described in 2018
Negativicutes